The Yellow Death is a 1920 German silent thriller film directed by Carl Wilhelm and starring Eduard von Winterstein, Guido Herzfeld and Frida Richard. It was released in two parts, premiering at the Marmorhaus in Berlin.

The film's sets were designed by the art director Fritz Kraenke.

Cast
 Eduard von Winterstein as Polizeimeister Karpuschkin
 Esther Hagan as Tochter Anna
 Guido Herzfeld as Juwelier Salomon Ascher
 Rosa Valetti as Awdotja, genannt "Großmütterchen", Besitzerin des Varietés "Elysium"
 Fred Juncker as Leutnant Barsoleff
 Rudolf Klein-Rhoden as Dr. Zborowitsch, Redakteur
 Aenderly Lebius as Graf Majewsky
 Frida Richard as Rebekka
 Gustav Adolf Semler as Alexander, his son, prosecutor
 Lilly Sueß-Eisenlohr as Rahel
 Maria Wefers as Sonja
 Wilhelm Prager as Smudra, Sanitätsrat
 Fritz Falkner as Bursche Iwan

References

Bibliography
 Bock, Hans-Michael & Bergfelder, Tim. The Concise CineGraph. Encyclopedia of German Cinema. Berghahn Books, 2009.

External links

1920 films
Films of the Weimar Republic
German silent feature films
Films directed by Carl Wilhelm
German black-and-white films
1920s German films
German thriller films
Silent thriller films